Gregory II served as Greek Patriarch of Alexandria between 1316 and 1354.

References

14th-century Patriarchs of Alexandria